Turamichele ("Tower-Michael") is the name of a moving mechanical figure on the Perlach Tower (Perlachturm) next to Perlach church in Augsburg, Bavaria, Germany. It shows the Archangel Michael fighting with the devil. Every year on 29 September (Michaelmas or St. Michael's Day) the Turamichele appears in a window on the west side of the tower. The day is also marked by a big children's party.

See also
 Mary Untier of Knots in Perlach church

Augsburg
Statues in Germany